Hexapolis, meaning "six cities", may refer to:

 Doric Hexapolis, a federation of Greek city-states in southwestern Asia Minor founded by Doric colonists
 Armenian Hexapolis, a group of six cities in Armenia Minor